Thermanaerovibrio is a Gram-negative, non-spore-forming chemoorganotrophic and thermophilic genus of bacteria from the family of Synergistaceae.

References

Synergistota
Bacteria genera